The following lists events that happened during 1966 in the Grand Duchy of Luxembourg.

Incumbents

Events
 29 January – The Luxembourg Compromise is reached to resolve an impasse in the European Union.
 5 March – Luxembourg City hosts the Eurovision Song Contest 1966 after France Gall's victory the previous year.  Representing Luxembourg, Michèle Torr finishes tenth with the song Ce soir je t'attendais.
 21 March – The Economic and Social Council is created to aid industrial relations between employers, employees, and the government.

Births
 16 March – Félix Braz, politician
 15 November – Octavie Modert, politician

Deaths

Footnotes

References